Maggert is a surname. Notable people with the surname include:

Harl Maggert (disambiguation), multiple people
Jeff Maggert (born 1964), American golfer